Sheikh Sadi Khan (born 1950) is a Bangladeshi composer and music director. He won Bangladesh National Film Award for Best Music Director for the film Ghani (2006) and Best Music Composer for Bhalobaslei Ghor Bandha Jay Na (2010). He won Ekushey Padak in 2018 by the Government of Bangladesh.

Early life and career
Khan began his career under the guardianship of his father Ustad Ayet Ali Khan. He took lessons as a violinist from his elder brother Ustad Bahadur Khan.

Khan joined Pakistan Radio in 1965. He started as a Behala player. When the Liberation War of Bangladesh broke out in 1971, he migrated to Kolkata and worked for Swadhin Bangla Betar Kendra. In the early 1970s, he worked as an assistant to the composer Khandaker Nurul Alam. He continued playing the violin in films as well as composing music for Bangladesh Betar. He was the music director of the film Ekhoni Somoy (1980), directed by Abdullah Al Mamun.

As of 2014, Khan is serving as the Chief Music Producer of Bangladesh Betar.

Awards
 Bangladesh National Film Award for Best Music Director  (2006)
 Bangladesh National Film Award for Best Music Composer  (2010)
 BACHSAS Best Music Composer Award (3 times)
 Celebrating Life Lifetime Achievement Award (2014)
 Ekushey Padak (2018)

Works

Albums
  Sweet Dreams (2012)

References

External links
 
 

Living people
1950 births
People from Brahmanbaria district
Bangladeshi composers
Best Music Director National Film Award (Bangladesh) winners
Recipients of the Ekushey Padak
Date of birth missing (living people)
Best Music Composer National Film Award (Bangladesh) winners